Jocelyn Brudenell Pelham, 6th Earl of Chichester, OBE (21 May 1871 – 14 November 1926) was a British nobleman.

The elder son of Francis Pelham, 5th Earl of Chichester, and Alice, the daughter of 1st Baron Wolverton, he was educated at Eton. In 1898 he married  Ruth Buxton with whom he had four children: Lady Elizabeth, Francis, Lady Prudence, who married Guy Branch, and John. He was a Deputy Lieutenant of Sussex; a Public Works Loan Commissioner and a Brevet Lieutenant-Colonel of the Royal Sussex Regiment.

He was awarded the O.B.E. in 1918.

References

1871 births
1926 deaths
Deputy Lieutenants of Sussex
Earls of Chichester
Officers of the Order of the British Empire
People educated at Eton College
Royal Sussex Regiment officers
Jocelyn